Ahmed Mubarak Salah Al-Saadi (born 28 December 1988) is an Omani sprinter specialising in the 400 metres. He won a bronze medal at the 2017 Asian Championships.

His personal bests in the event are 45.89 seconds outdoors (Jeddah 2017) and 48.46 seconds indoors (Ashgabat 2017).

International competitions

References

1988 births
Living people
Omani male sprinters
Athletes (track and field) at the 2014 Asian Games
Asian Games competitors for Oman
Islamic Solidarity Games medalists in athletics